Shirley School District is a school district based in Shirley, Arkansas. The school district supports all of Shirley and portions of Fairfield Bay in northeastern Van Buren County and a minor portion of southwestern Stone County along Arkansas Highway 110.

Schools 
 Shirley Elementary School, serving kindergarten through grade 6.
 Shirley High School, serving grades 7 through 12.

References

External links
 

Education in Van Buren County, Arkansas
Education in Stone County, Arkansas
School districts in Arkansas